Laurien van der Graaff (born 14 October 1987) is a Swiss, former cross-country skier.

Career
Born in the Netherlands to Dutch parents, she has dual citizenship. Her family moved to Switzerland when she was four. Van der Graaff competed at the 2014 Winter Olympics for Switzerland. She placed 20th in the qualifying round in the sprint, advancing to the quarterfinals. She then finished 5th in that quarterfinal, failing to advance.

As of April 2014, her best showing at the World Championships is 11th, in the freestyle team sprint in 2013. Her best individual finish is 30th, in the 2013 classical sprint.

Van der Graaff made her World Cup debut in March 2008. As of April 2014, she has two podium finishes, with the best a silver medal, in a freestyle sprint race at Nove Mesto in 2013–14. Her best World Cup overall finish is 24th, in 2013–14. Her best World Cup finish in a discipline is 7th, in the sprint in 2013–14.

She announced her retirement from cross-country skiing in March, 2022.

Cross-country skiing results
All results are sourced from the International Ski Federation (FIS).

Olympic Games

World Championships
1 medal – (1 silver)

World Cup

Season standings

Individual podiums
 2 victories – (1 , 1 ) 
 5 podiums – (4 , 1 )

Team podiums
1 victory – (1  ) 
4 podiums – (4 )

References

External links

1987 births
Living people
Swiss female cross-country skiers
Dutch female cross-country skiers
Tour de Ski skiers
Dutch emigrants to Switzerland
Olympic cross-country skiers of Switzerland
Cross-country skiers at the 2014 Winter Olympics
Cross-country skiers at the 2018 Winter Olympics
Cross-country skiers at the 2022 Winter Olympics
People from Graubünden
People from Nieuwkoop
FIS Nordic World Ski Championships medalists in cross-country skiing
Sportspeople from South Holland